Vincent James Maguire (31 July 1892 – 8 June 1929) was an Australian rules footballer who played with Geelong in the Victorian Football League (VFL).

Notes

External links 

1892 births
1929 deaths
Australian rules footballers from Victoria (Australia)
Geelong Football Club players
Brighton Football Club players